is a Japanese volleyball player who plays for Hisamitsu Springs. She also plays for the All-Japan women's volleyball team. Her father is Hideyuki Ōtake, who is a former volleyball player. Her younger brother, Issei Otake [大竹壱青], is also a volleyball player and plays for the national men's team as well as Panasonic Panthers.

On 19 December 2011, Denso announced that she was joining the team.

Ōtake played for the All-Japan team for the first time at the 2012 Asian Women's Cup Volleyball Championship in September 2012.

Clubs
  ShukutokuSC Junior High
  Shimokitazawa Seitoku Highschool
  Denso Airybees (2012–2021)
  Hisamitsu Springs (2021–present)

Awards

Individuals
 2012 - All Japan Highschools championship - Excellent player award

Clubs
 2012 - All Japan Highschools championship -  Bronze Medal with Shimokitazawa Seitoku Highschool

National Team 
 2013 Asian Championship -  Silver medal

References

External links
 Riho Ōtake - Denso Airybees - Profile
 FIVB Women's Grand Champion Cup 2013 - Player's Biography
 FIVB Volleyball World Grand Prix 2013 - Player's Biography
 FIVB Women's World Olympic Qualification Tournament 2012 - Player's Biography
 FIVB Volleyball World Grand Prix 2012 - Player's Biography

Japanese women's volleyball players
Living people
1993 births
People from Yokohama
Denso Airybees players
Volleyball players at the 2014 Asian Games
Asian Games competitors for Japan